The Gazette van Gent was a twice-weekly newspaper originally published in Ghent from 1723 to 1809 under the title Gazette van Ghendt. The publisher switched to French in 1809, first under the title Gazette de Gand and from 1811 as Journal du département de l'Escaut. Dutch-language publication resumed in 1814, initially under the title Gazette van Gend, and continued until 1940, with a hiatus during the First World War.

Publication history
The first owners were F. and D. vander Ween (1723), with Dominicus vander Ween taking over sole proprietorship in 1734. In 1748 ownership was acquired by Petrus Joannes Vereecken, who transferred it to Michiel de Goesin in 1749. From 1761 the publisher was Jan Meyer, succeeded by his widow and heirs in 1771, and then his son, Jan Meyer. In 1794 J. F. Vander Schueren acquired ownership from Jan Meyer's widow. He was succeeded by F. J. Bogaert in 1804. Bogaert switched publication to French in 1809, then back to Dutch in 1814. Around 1830 the newspaper was acquired by the Vanderhaeghen-Hulin family, who continued to publish it until 1940.

Licensing
Originally licensed by the imperial authorities of the Austrian Netherlands, from 1789 to 1790 the licensing body was first the United States of Belgium and then the States of Flanders. During the French occupation (1794 onwards) the Departmental Prefect controlled publication. The newspaper bore the motto Vryheyd, Gelykheyd, Onpartydigheyd (Liberty, Equality, Impartiality) from 1794 to 1801.

References

Further reading
 Désiré Destanberg, Gent onder Jozef II, 1780-1792 (Ghent, 1910), passim.
 E. Voordeckers, Bijdrage tot de geschiedenis van de Gentse pers. Repertorium (1667–1914) (Leuven and Paris, 1964), 207–211.

External links
 Digitized editions and library holdings on Abraham. Belgian Newspaper Catalogue (1749-1766, 1784).
 Issues from 1803 on Google Books.
 Letters patent of Maria Theresia to Jean-François Meyer as publisher of the Gazette de Gand, 1 July 1771 available on Google Books.

1723 establishments in the Habsburg monarchy
1723 establishments in the Holy Roman Empire
Establishments in the Austrian Netherlands
1940 disestablishments in Belgium
Defunct newspapers published in Belgium
Dutch-language newspapers published in Belgium
French-language newspapers published in Belgium
History of Ghent
Publications established in 1723
Publications disestablished in 1940
Mass media in Ghent